Jo Young-min (born 24 April 1995) is a South Korean actor, model and singer. He is a member of Boyfriend.

Biography and career
Born on 1995, April 24 in Seoul, Jo Youngmin is the older twin by 6 minutes over his younger twin brother Jo Kwangmin. He and Kwangmin trained under JYP Entertainment for two years. They started modeling since they were children and appeared in various commercials. By their 100th day mark of being child actors, the twins had appeared in over 300 commercials. Jo Youngmin also appears in various dramas and movies.

Discography

Filmography

Television

Film

References

External links 
 
 

1995 births
Living people
21st-century South Korean male actors
South Korean male models
South Korean male television actors
South Korean male film actors
South Korean male idols
South Korean male singers
South Korean pop singers